Children of Heracles (Hērakleidai; also translated as Herakles' Children and Heracleidae) is an Athenian tragedy by Euripides that was first performed c. 430 BC. It follows the children of Heracles (known as the Heracleidae) as they seek protection from Eurystheus. It is the first of two surviving tragedies by Euripides where the children of Heracles are suppliants (the second being Heracles).

Background

Eurystheus was responsible for many of the troubles of Heracles. In order to prevent the children of Heracles from taking revenge on him, he sought to kill them. They flee under the protection of Iolaus, Heracles' close friend and nephew.

Plot synopsis

The play begins at the altar of Zeus at Marathon. The herald Copreus, in the employ of King Eurystheus of Mycenae, attempts to seize the children of Heracles, together with Heracles's old friend, Iolaus. When King Demophon, son of Theseus, insists that Iolaus and Heracles's children are under his protection, Copreus threatens to return with an army. Demophon is prepared to protect the children even at the cost of fighting a war against Eurystheus, but after consulting the oracles, he learns that the Athenians will be victorious only if they sacrifice a maiden of noble birth to Persephone. Demophon tells Iolaus that as much as he would like to help, he will not sacrifice his own child or force any of the Athenians to do so. Iolaus, realizing that he and the children will have to leave Athens and seek refuge elsewhere, despairs.

When Macaria, a daughter of Heracles, hears about the oracle's pronouncement and realizes her family's predicament, she offers herself as the victim, refusing a lottery. Bidding farewell to her siblings and to Iolaus, she leaves to be sacrificed. At the same time, Hyllus arrives with reinforcements. Although Iolaus is old and feeble, he insists on going out to the battle. Once there, he miraculously regains his youth and captures Eurystheus. A debate about executing him follows. Alcmene, Heracles's aged mother, insists that Eurystheus be executed at once, though such an execution is against Athenian law. Finally, Eurystheus tells them a prophecy of how his spirit will protect the city from the descendants of Heracles's children if they slay and bury him, and so it is done.

Translations
 Edward P. Coleridge, 1891, prose, The Heracleidae: full text
 Arthur S. Way, 1912, verse
 Ralph Gladstone, 1955, verse
 Henry Taylor and Robert A. Brooks, 1981, The Children of Herakles
 David Kovacs, 1994, prose, Heracleidae: full text
 John Davie, 1996, Children of Heracles
 Kenneth McLeish, 1997, Herakles' Children
 George Theodoridis, 2010, prose, Herakleidae: full text
 Mark Griffith, 2013, The Children of Heracles

References

Sources

 Burian, Peter, and Alan Shapiro, eds. 2010. The Complete Euripides. By Euripides. Vol. 3. The Greek Tragedy in New Translations ser. Oxford and New York: Oxford. .
 Davie, John, trans. 2003. Medea and Other Plays. By Euripides. London and New York: Penguin. . 
 Walton, J. Michael, and Kenneth McLeish, eds. 1997. Plays: V. By Euripides. Methuen Classical Greek Dramatists ser. London: Methuen. .

Plays by Euripides
Heracles in fiction
Dorian mythology
Plays set in ancient Greece
Athens in fiction
Plays based on classical mythology